A Künstlerroman (plural -ane), meaning "artist's novel" in English, is a narrative about an artist's growth to maturity. It could be classified as a sub-category of Bildungsroman: a coming-of-age novel. According to Encyclopaedia Britannica, one way a Künstlerroman may differ from a Bildungsroman is its ending, where a Künstlerroman hero rejects the everyday life, but a Bildungsroman hero settles for being an ordinary citizen. According to Oxford Reference, the difference may lie in a longer view across the Künstlerroman hero's whole life, not just their childhood years.

Examples by language

German
Johann Wolfgang von Goethe's 1795 Wilhelm Meister's Apprenticeship
Ludwig Tieck's 1798 Franz Sternbalds Wanderungen
Novalis's 1802 Heinrich von Ofterdingen
Hermann Hesse's Demian (1919) and Klingsor's Last Summer (1920)
Thomas Mann's Tonio Kröger (1903), and Doctor Faustus (1947)
Jakob Wassermann's 1915 Das Gänsemännchen
Rainer Maria Rilke's 1910 The Notebooks of Malte Laurids Brigge
Eduard Mörike's 1856 Mozart on the way to Prague

English

1805 William Wordsworth's The Prelude
1833–34 Thomas Carlyle's Sartor Resartus
1847 Charlotte Brontë's Jane Eyre
1848 Anne Brontë's The Tenant of Wildfell Hall
1850 Charles Dickens' David Copperfield
1852 Herman Melville's Pierre: or, The Ambiguities
1856 Elizabeth Barrett Browning's Aurora Leigh
1875 Henry James's Roderick Hudson
1890 Henry James's The Tragic Muse
1903 Samuel Butler's The Way of All Flesh
1909 Jack London's Martin Eden
1913 D. H. Lawrence's Sons and Lovers
1915 W. Somerset Maugham's Of Human Bondage
1915 Willa Cather's The Song of the Lark
1916 James Joyce's A Portrait of the Artist as a Young Man
1918 Wyndham Lewis's Tarr
1920 F. Scott Fitzgerald's This Side of Paradise
1928 Radclyffe Hall's The Well of Loneliness
1929 Thomas Wolfe's Look Homeward, Angel
1933 Malcolm Lowry's Ultramarine
1936 George Orwell's Keep the Aspidistra Flying
1939 John Fante's Ask the Dust
1943 Betty Smith's A Tree Grows in Brooklyn
1945 Richard Wright's Black Boy
1946 Philip Larkin's Jill
1947 W.O. Mitchell's Who Has Seen the Wind
1952 Patricia Highsmith's The Price of Salt
1952 Ernest Buckler's The Mountain and the Valley
1955 William Gaddis's The Recognitions
1961 Irving Stone's The Agony and the Ecstasy
1963 Leonard Cohen's The Favourite Game
1970 Patrick White's The Vivisector
1971 Alice Munro's Lives of Girls and Women
1972 Chaim Potok's My Name Is Asher Lev
1973 Milan Kundera's Life Is Elsewhere
1974 Margaret Laurence's The Diviners
1978 John Irving's The World According to Garp
1981 Alasdair Gray's Lanark: A Life in Four Books
1982 Charles Bukowski's Ham on Rye
1985 Jeanette Winterson's Oranges Are Not the Only Fruit
1988 Margaret Atwood's Cat's Eye
1999 Tracy Chevalier's Girl with a Pearl Earring
2003 Jennifer Donnelly's A Northern Light
2006 Alison Bechdel's Fun Home
2006 Stew's Passing Strange
2010 Patti Smith's Just Kids
2010 Eileen Myles's Inferno (A Poet's Novel)
2010 Wena Poon's Alex y Robert
2011 Ben Lerner's Leaving the Atocha Station
2017 Ocean Vuong's On Earth We're Briefly Gorgeous
2020 Andrew Unger's Once Removed

Notes
A semiautobiographical narrative takes up two of the four books of Gray's Lanark. 
In John Dos Passos' U.S.A. trilogy, the Camera Eye sections add up to a modernist autobiographical Künstlerroman. 
John Barth's Lost in the Funhouse is a collection of short stories that are often read as a postmodernist Künstlerroman.

French
1831, 1837 Honore de Balzac's The Unknown Masterpiece
1904–1905 Romain Rolland's Jean-Christophe
1913– 1927 Marcel Proust's In Search of Lost Time

Italian
Gabriele D'Annunzio's Il Piacere, Le Vergini Delle Rocce and Il Fuoco
1975 Gavino Ledda's My Father, My Master (Padre Padrone)
2012–2015 Elena Ferrante's Neapolitan Novels

Icelandic
Halldór Laxness's World Light
Halldór Laxness's The Fish Can Sing

Russian
Vladimir Nabokov's The Gift

Croatian
1932 Miroslav Krleža's The Return of Filip Latinovicz

Malayalam
1993 Perumbadavam Sreedharan's Oru Sankeerthanam Pole

Norwegian
2009–2011 Karl Ove Knausgaard's My Struggle (Knausgård novels)
1890 Knut Hamsun's Hunger (“Sult”)

Portuguese
1883 Maria Benedita Bormann's Lésbia
1976 Ferreira Gullar's Poema Sujo

Turkish
1896–1897 Halit Ziya Uşaklıgil's Blue and Black (Mavi ve Siyah)
1972 Oğuz Atay’s Tutunamayanlar
1959 Yusuf Atılgan’s Aylak adam

Bengali
1999 Malay Roy Choudhury's Chhotoloker Chhotobela

References

 
Fiction by genre
German words and phrases
Lists of books by genre
Novels about artists